This is a list of launches made by the Proton rocket between 1970 and 1979. All launches were conducted from the Baikonur Cosmodrome.

Launches

| colspan="6" |

1970

|-

| colspan="6" |

1971

|-

| colspan="6" |

1972

|-

| colspan="6" |

1973

|-

| colspan="6" |

1974

|-

| colspan="6" |

1975

|-

|-
| colspan="6" |

1976

|-

| colspan="6" |

1977

|-

| colspan="6" |

1978

|-

| colspan="6" |

1979

|-

|}

References

Universal Rocket (rocket family)
Proton1970
Proton launches